TWT may refer to:

 Sanga-Sanga Airport (IATA code: TWT), an airport serving the general area of Bongao, the capital of the province of Tawi-Tawi in the Philippines
 Ted Williams Tunnel, the third highway tunnel under Boston Harbor in Boston
 Traveling-wave tube, a specialized vacuum tube that is used in electronics to amplify radio frequency signals in the microwave range
 The World Tomorrow (magazine), a defunct American political magazine
 , a Tunisian television channel